The women's 3000 meter at the 2023 KNSB Dutch Single Distance Championships in Heerenveen took place at Thialf ice skating rink on Saturday 4 February 2023. There were 16 participants. Antoinette Rijpma-de Jong, Joy Beune, and Irene Schouten qualified for the 2023 ISU World Speed Skating Championships in Heerenveen.

Statistics

Result

Referee: Loretta Staring.  Assistant: Miriam Kuiper.  Starter: Jans Rosing

Source:

Draw

References

Single Distance Championships
2023 Single Distance
World